Zenrakuji is a Shingon Buddhist Temple located in Kōchi, Kōchi, Japan. It is the 30th temple of the Shikoku Pilgrimage.

References 

Buddhist pilgrimage sites in Japan
Buddhist temples in Kōchi Prefecture
Kōyasan Shingon temples